In Zuñi mythology, the Aihayuta are a 2nd pair of twin-brother heroes who complement the 1st set of twin-brother heroes, the Ahayuta.

In literature
 "Parsons uses Aihayuta to refer to the second pair of Twins who were generated at Hanlhibinkya while the people were searching for the Center Place."
 "Bunzel (1932 : 597) states that the second pair ... were generated by a waterfall at Hanlhibinkya."
 "D. Tedlock (1972 : 225–69) gives the names Uyuyuwi and Ma’asewi to the pair of Twins who were created while the people were searching for the Center Place".

Notes

References
 Bunzel, Ruth L. : "Introduction to Zuñi Ceremonialism". Forty-Seventh Annual Report of the Bureau of American Ethnology, for the years 1929–1930. pp. 467–1086. Washington (DC), 1932.
 Parsons, Elsie C. : "The Origin Myth of the Zuñi". Journal of American Folklore 36 (1923) : 135–62.
 Tedlock, Dennis : Finding the Center : Narrative Poetry of the Zuni Indians. NY : Dial Press, 1972.

Zuni mythology
Gods of the indigenous peoples of North America